Suyetchai MLA is a 2006 Tamil-language political satire film directed by Guru Dhanapal. The film stars Sathyaraj and Goundamani. The film had musical score by Sabesh–Murali and was released on 5 May 2006 after many delays.

Plot
Nambirajan (Sathyaraj) and Visky (Goundamani) are lorry drivers and best friends. Both of them are very helpful to MLA Arivudaiyan (Nassar) with all his work. Nambirajan's sister Priya (Ammu) loves a rich boy Rakesh (Rakesh). Nambirajan and Rakesh's father Muthiah Pillai (Rajan P. Dev) then prepare their engagement. In the function, Muthiah talks ill about Nambirajan's poverty and insults him. Muthiah says that he would wed his son with Nambirajan's sister only when Nambirajan becomes a rich person. He also says that he would wed his daughter (Abitha) to Nambirajan at that time. General elections are announced in the State, and the ruling party refuses to again give seat to Arivudayan. He insults the party district leaders, and decides to contest as Independent candidate.

But Arivudayaan is killed before filing nomination. So, Nambirajan contests in his place, and by luck wins the election by 1% vote, and becomes an MLA. At the same time, the ruling party MKM gets 116 seats, and opposition TKM also gets 116 seats, with one seat's election postponed due to death of candidate. Since, Nambirajan's support can give either party majority in the House, both parties try to pull him into their coalition. TKM succeeds and Nambirajan visits their HQ. He asks their leader Kumaran to give him PWD minister post, and this causes the front runner for that post to threaten to leave the group. Then Nambirajan asks for Kumaran to give up his post in the cabinet, to avoid further issue. Since, Kumaran was posed to become Chief Minister, Nambirajan promises him to serve as rubber stamp CM. In order to fulfill his dream, Kumaran gives up the CM post, and becomes Deputy-Chief Minister instead.

Nambirajan starts off to work with clean hands, but the roughness of all politicians forces him to corruption. He earns thousands of crores of black money. When he starts to push Kumaran out of the party, they engage in cold war, resulting in the party siding with Nambirajan and Kumaran being kept as backbench MLA. Kumaran, and MMK leader Nathan then blame corruption charges of Nambirajan. Nambirajan accepts the charges, and forces the court to indict all MLAs including Kumaran and Nathan as accomplices. The Legislature is dissolved, and clean candidates are elected in the new Elections.

Cast

Sathyaraj as Nambirajan
Goundamani as Visky
Prakash Raj as Ilampirai
Nassar as Arivudaiyan
Rajan P. Dev as Muthiah Pillai
Abitha as Muthiah Pillai's daughter
Kavitha
Rakesh as Rakesh
Ammu as Priya
Mantra
Thilakan
Cochin Haneefa
Ponnambalam
Delhi Ganesh
Brinda Parekh
Shakeela
K. P. A. C. Lalitha
Paravai Muniyamma
Besant Ravi
Anu Mohan
Babilona
Srilekha
Anjali Devi

Production

Development
After directing comedy films like Thai Maaman and Maaman Magal, Guru Dhanapal teams up for the third time with the duo Sathyaraj and Goundamani. Sathyaraj said, "I feel the film will certainly entertain viewers as it will be an out-and-out laugh riot". The director, Guru Dhanapal, said "Sathyaraj gets a maximum mileage of the story with his histrionic and comedy talent".

Casting
Sathyaraj pairs with Mantra. Prakash Raj plays a big role and the rest of the cast includes Thilakan, Nassar, Rajan P. Dev, Cochin Haneefa, Ponnambalam, Delhi Ganesh, and a new find Rakesh. Sabesh–Murali composed the film soundtrack and background music, while D. Shankar and R. Suresh Rajhan were the cinematographer and the editor respectively.

Filming
At the time of release, the LIC Housing Finance took the film to court. The official had stated that Stanley P. Rajan and his associates, who jointly produced the film, had cheated the company of Rs. 50.39 lakhs. According to him, Mr Rajan had obtained a housing loan of Rs. 25 lakhs by submitting fake address and false particulars in his application. His associates too applied for and availed themselves of the loan using a similar modus operandi. After obtaining the housing loans, they diverted the sum for film production without using for building houses.

Soundtrack

The film score and the soundtrack were composed by Sabesh–Murali. The soundtrack, released in 2004, features 3 tracks with lyrics written by Gangai Amaran.

References

2006 films
2000s Tamil-language films
Indian political satire films
Films directed by Guru Dhanapal